League tables for teams participating in Ykkönen, the second tier of the Finnish Soccer League system, in 2008.

League table

Promotion play-offs
KuPS as 13th placed team in the 2008 Veikkausliiga and FC Viikingit as runners-up of the 2008 Ykkönen competed in a two-legged play-off for a place in the Veikkausliiga. KuPS won the play-offs by 2-1 on aggregate and remained in Veikkausliiga.

Viikingit Helsinki - KuPS Kuopio   1-2
KuPS Kuopio - Viikingit Helsinki   0-0

References

Sources
 Finnish FA (Suomen Palloliitto)

Ykkönen seasons
2008 in Finnish football
Fin
Fin